Blello is a comune (municipality) in the Province of Bergamo in the Italian region of Lombardy, located about  northeast of Milan and about  northwest of Bergamo.

Blello borders the following municipalities: Brembilla, Corna Imagna, Gerosa.

Demographic evolution

References